The IBSA European Judo Championships is an event organized by the International Blind Sports Federation (IBSA). It is a paralympic judo competition, that is judo for visually impaired athletes. Organised biennially, the competition is not run during years when the IBSA World Judo Championships or the Summer Paralympics are contested.

Championships

Classification
B1 - Athletes who are legally blind.
B2 - Athletes who are visually impaired.
B3 - Athletes who have partial vision.

See also
Judo at the Summer Paralympics
IBSA World Judo Championships

References

 
Judo competitions
Parasports competitions
Judo in Europe
Recurring sporting events established in 1989